Johnathan Hudson (born May 4, 1987) is an American professional basketball player for Eleftheroupoli Kavalas of the Greek 2nd Division. He attended Texas A&M (2006–2010).

College career
Hudson attended Texas A&M from 2006 to 2010.

Professional career
In 14 games for Dzukija Alytus he averaged 2.5 points and 1.6 assists.
On January 11, 2018, he signed with the Macedonian basketball club Blokotehna.
He made his debut for the Blokotehna on January 21, 2018, scoring 3 points, one rebound and one assist in a 67–74 away win over the Pelister. On February 1, 2018, he part ways with Blokotehna.
On season 2018/19 he signed a contract with UBSC Raiffeisen Graz that plays in ÖBL the top men's professional basketball league in Austria. In December 2018 he moved to BC Nokia that plays in Korisliiga the top men's professional basketball league in Finland

References

External links
Eurobasket.com Profile
RealGM Profile

1987 births
Living people
American expatriate basketball people in North Macedonia
People from Sugar Land, Texas
Point guards
Texas A&M Aggies men's basketball players
American men's basketball players